Reza Kianian (born June 19, 1951 in Tehran) is an Iranian actor. He has received various accolades, including two Crystal Simorgh, a Hafez Award and two Iran Cinema Celebration Awards.

Early life 
Kianian is the second child of a family of 9; he has 4 brothers and 2 sisters. When he was 1 year old, his family moved to Mashhad. His first acting coach was his older brother, Davood. In 1965, Davood directed and coached Reza in his first role in a play titled Az Paa Nayoftadeha, written by Gholam Hossein Sa'edi. He continued to work with Davood's theater troupe for the next 3 years, when he moved back to Tehran to study fine arts at the University of Tehran, where he graduated in 1976. Reza Kianian married his wife, Hayedeh, on March 21 (the Persian New Year) in 1983.

Career

Theater 
Kianian starting his acting career in theater. He began acting in 1965, when he was only 15 years old. Later on in life, he took the stage in renditions of plays such as Antigone, Petty Bourgeois, Simon Masha Figures, Mississippi's Marriage, Souvenir of the Sand Years and many more. In April 2010, after a six-year hiatus from theater, Kianian returned  to stage under the direction of Atila Pesyani in Professor Bvbvs.

Television 

Reza Kianian has acted in some television series as well. Perhaps his most memorable role in television has been his character 'Jamshid' in Shellike Nahayi (The Final Shot) directed by Mohsen Shahmohammadi, where 'Jamshid-style' outfits and hairstyle became popular with the youth of Iran. In The English Bag and The Rebel Years he portrayed an old clergyman and a judge respectively, which are considered his most controversial roles to date.

Other ventures 
Besides being an actor, Reza Kianian is also a painter, sculptor and set designer. His set design for the movie Niloofar-e Abi (The Lotus) won him an industry award at the 17th Fajr International Film Festival in 1998. Kianian's photo and paintings have been exhibited in two solo exhibits in 2008 and 2010, and in over five group exhibits.  In 2007 he also held a solo sculptor exhibit.  In 2012, Reza Kianian was the auctioneer for the first ever Christie's style auction in Tehran, Tehran Auction.  The auction was a sold out event, making over $1 million.

Filmography

Television
 Apartment, directed by Asghar Hashemi, 1994
 Shellike Nahayi (The Final Shot), directed by Mohsen Shahmohammadi, 1996
 The English Bag, directed by Ziaeddin Dorri 2000
 Doran-e Sarkeshi (The Rebel Years), directed by Kamal Tabrizi, 2002
 Yek Mosht Par-e Oghab (A Fistful of Eagle Feathers), directed by Asghar Hashemi, 2007–2008
 Roozegar-e Gharib (Strange Times), directed by Kianoush Ayyari, 2002–2008
 Mokhtarnameh  directed by Davoud Mirbagheri, 2004–2008
 Ghalb-e Yakhi (Frozen Heart), directed by Saman Moghadam, 2012
 Rahe Toolani (Long Way), directed by Reza Mir-Karimi, 2012
 Kolah Pahlavi (Pahlavi Hat), directed by Ziaeddin Dorri, 2013
 King of Ear, directed by Davood Mir Bagheri, 2013
 Puzzle, directed by Ebrahim Sheibani, 2014
 Shahrzad, directed by Hassan Fathi, 2018
 Siavash, directed by Soroush Mohammadzadeh, 2021

Film
All of Earth's Temptations (Tamam-e vasvaseha-ye zamin), directed by Hamid Samandarian, 1989
Patal and Small Dreams (Patal va Arezoohaye Koochak), directed by Masoud Karamati, 1989
Ilya, the Young Painter (Ilya, Naghash-e Javan), directed by Abolhassan Davoodi, 1991
The Unfinished Man (Mard-e Natamam), directed by Moharram Zienalzadeh, 1992
Common Pain (Dard-e Moshtarek), directed by Yasaman Malek Nasr, 1994
Kimia, directed by Ahmad Reza Darvish, 1995
My Mother, Gisoo (Madaram, Gisoo), directed by Siamak Shayeghi, 1995
Sultan (Soltan), directed by Masoud Kimiai, 1996
Cinema is Cinema (Cinema, Cinemast), directed by Ziaeddin Dorri, 1996
The Red Ribbon (Rooban-e Ghermez), directed by Ebrahim Hatamikia, 1998
The Glass Agency (Ajans-e Shisheh-i), directed by Ebrahim Hatamikia, 1998
Smell of Camphor, Scent of Jasmine (Booye Kafoor, Atre Yas), directed by Bahman Farmanara, 2000
An Umbrella for Two (Chatri Baray-e Do Nafar), directed by Ahmad Amini, 2000
Killing Mad Dogs (Sag Koshi), directed by Bahram Beizai, 2001
Issa Will Come (Issa Miayad), directed by Ali Zhekan, 2001
Romshekan's Wedding (Aroosiye Romshekan), directed by Naser Gholamrezaei, 2001
A House Built on Water (Khaneye Rooy-e Ab), directed by Bahman Farmanara, 2001
Look At the Sky Sometimes (Gahi Be Aseman Negah Kon), directed by Kamal Tabrizi, 2003
The Wind Carpet (Kaze no jûtan) or Farshe Bad, directed by Kamal Tabrizi, 2003
Open Vote (Ra'i baz), directed by Mehdi Noorbakhsh, 2003
Foothold (Ghadamgah), directed by Mohammad Mehdi Asgarpour, 2004
A Piece of Bread (Yek Teke Nan), directed by Kamal Tabrizi, 2005
A Little Kiss (Yek boos-e Koochooloo), directed by Bahman Farmanara, 2005
The Fish Fall in Love (Mahiha Ashegh Mishavand), directed by Ali Rafie, 2005

Zagross , directed by Mohammad Ali Najafi, 2005
Bagh Ferdows, 5PM (Bagh Ferdows, Panj-e Bad Az Zohr), directed by Siamak Shayeghi, 2005
The Horse (Asb), directed by Babak Mohammadi, 2005
Men at Work (Kargaran Mashghool-e Karand), directed by Mani Haghighi, 2006
Three Women (Se Zan), directed by Manijeh Hekmat, 2006
There is Always a Woman Involved (Hamishe Paye Yek Zan Dar Mian Ast), directed by Kamal Tabrizi, 2007
Sad Saal Beh In Salha (English Title: Miss Iran), directed by Saman Moghadam, 2007
Familiar Territory (Khake Ashena), directed by Bahman Farmanara, 2008
7:05 , directed by Mohammad Mehdi Asgarpour, 2008
Plot 88 (Ghat-eye 88), directed by Rahman Haghighi, 2008
Voices (Sedaha), directed by Farzad Motamen, 2008
Three Women directed by Manijeh Hekmat
The Sting and the Bee (Nish O Zanboor), directed by Hamid Reza Salahmand, 2009
Reports from a Party (Gozaresh-e Yek Jashn), directed by Ebrahim Hatamikia, 2010
A Cube of Sugar (Ye habe ghand), directed by Seyyed Reza Mir-Karimi, 2010
The Maritime Silk Road (Rah-e Abi Abrisham), directed by Mohammad Bozorgnia, 2012
Laboratory (Azmayeshgah), directed by Hamid Amjad, 2012
Migraine (Migren), directed by Maneli Shojaee Fard, 2012
Miss Iran (Saad Saal Be In Salha), directed by Saman Moghadam, 2012
No Where No Body (Hich Koja Hich Kas), directed by Ebrahim Sheibani, 2013
I Want to Dance (Delam Mikhad), directed by Bahman Farmanara, 2014
There are no Particular News (Khabar e Khasi Nist), directed by Mostafa Shayesteh, 2014
Barcode (Barcode),  directed by Mostafa Kiayee, 2016
Where Are My Shoes? (Kafshhayam Koo?),  directed by Kiumars Pourahmad, 2016
After the Incident (Bad az Etefagh),  directed by Pouria Heidary Oureh, 2020

Bibliography
Reza Kianian is the author of 9 books in Iran.

 Sevoomin Sarneveshte Davoud (Davoud's Third Destiny)
 Bazigari (Acting)
 Tahlil-e Bazigari (Analyzing Acting)
 Sho'bade-ye Bazgari (Magic of Acting)
 Bazigari Dar Ghab (Acting in Frame)
 Naser o Fardin (Naser and Fardin)
 Aks haye Tanhaee (Images of Loneliness)
 In Mardom-e Nazanin (These Lovely People) 
 Ghaar-e Sevom (The Third Cave)

Awards and nominations
 Nominated Crystal Simorgh for Best Supporting Actor 13th Fajr International Film Festival
 Winner Crystal Simorgh for Best Supporting Actor 16th Fajr International Film Festival
 Winner Crystal Simorgh for Best Actor 20th Fajr International Film Festival
 Winner Golden Statue House of Cinema for Best Actor 2003
 Nominated Crystal Simorgh for Best Actor 21st Fajr International Film Festival
 Winner Golden Bred for Best Actor 21st Fajr International Film Festival
 Winner Golden Statue House of Cinema for Best Actor 2005
 Nominated Crystal Simorgh for Best Actor 23rd Fajr International Film Festival
 Nominated Golden Statue House of Cinema for Best Supporting Actor 2008
 Jury Award International Film Festival of Kerala 2008
 Hafez Award for a lifetime artistic Activity 2008
 Named one of top five most important actors in history of Iranian cinema by the critics and panel of the Film Monthly Magazine
 Nominated Crystal Simorgh for Best Actor 34th Fajr International Film Festival

References

Reza Kianian's Biography

External links

Official website

 Reza Kianian's woodworks
Tehran Auction News

1951 births
Living people
People from Mashhad
Iranian photographers
Male actors from Tehran
Iranian male film actors
Iranian male stage actors
University of Tehran alumni
Iranian male television actors
Crystal Simorgh for Best Actor winners
Crystal Simorgh for Best Supporting Actor winners